"Safe in the Arms of Love" is a country music song written by Mary Ann Kennedy, Pam Rose and Pat Bunch in 1986. The song was originally recorded by the American country music band Wild Choir. It was issued on their self-titled debut album in 1986 and was also released as the project's lead single. The song failed to chart. A music video, directed by David Hogan, was shot for the band's version and was scheduled to be broadcast on MTV, but due to a program change, never aired.

In 1994, two of the song's co-writers, Mary Ann Kennedy and Pam Rose who were performing as Kennedy Rose, recorded the song on their second album, Walk the Line.

Content
In the song, the female narrator states that she is tired of being on her own, and that she wants a lover.

Cover versions
The song was later recorded by Baillie & the Boys in 1989 on their Turn the Tide album.

Michelle Wright version

In late 1994, Michelle Wright recorded and released the song as a single the following year. Her version was included on her 1994 album The Reasons Why.

Martina McBride version

Martina McBride recorded "Safe in the Arms of Love" in 1995 and released it as a single. McBride's version can be found on her 1995 album Wild Angels.

The music video for the song was directed by Steven Goldmann, and premiered in mid-1995. It was shot in Montreal, Canada at the training school for the Cirque du Soleil. It features acrobats and performers in full makeup. As the song ends, McBride is shown lying in a field of grass and smelling a bouquet of flowers.

Billboard gave McBride's version a positive review, saying that it "sounds custom-made for country radio" and is "nicely complemented by the backing vocals".

Chart performance

Michelle Wright

Year-end charts

Martina McBride

Year-end charts

Other versions
Anne Kirkpatrick recorded the song in 1987 on her LP Come Back Again.
Lisa Stanley recorded the song in 2017 on her album Heart and Soul.

References

1986 singles
1995 singles
Wild Choir songs
Baillie & the Boys songs
Martina McBride songs
Michelle Wright songs
Songs written by Mary Ann Kennedy (American singer)
Songs written by Pam Rose
Arista Nashville singles
RCA Records singles
Song recordings produced by Paul Worley
Music videos directed by Steven Goldmann
Songs written by Pat Bunch
1986 songs